John Hewitt (23 December 1880 – 4 August 1961) was a South African zoologist and archaeologist of British origin.  He was born in Dronfield, Derbyshire, England, and died in Grahamstown, South Africa.  He was the author of several herpetological papers which described new species. He also described new species of spiders and other arachnids.

Biography 
He graduated with a first-class in natural sciences from Jesus College, Cambridge in 1903.  From 1905 to 1908 he was Curator of the Sarawak Museum in Kuching, Sarawak.

In 1909 he went to South Africa to work as an assistant curator at the Transvaal Museum in Pretoria.  In 1910 he was appointed Director of the Albany Museum in Grahamstown, eventually retiring in 1958. His daughter, Florence Ellen Hewitt (1910–1979), was a teacher and phycologist.  He was a founder member of the South African Museums Association  and following his retirement as director the new wing of the Albany Museum in 1958 was named after him. He was succeeded as archaeologist at the Albany Museum by Hilary Deacon.

Archaeological work
Hewitt began investigating into Stone age sites in the Grahamstown area of the Eastern Cape; there in collaboration with C. W. Wilmot he excavated a cave on the farm Wilton,  and described the culture that has ever since been known as Wilton culture.

With the Reverend A. P. Stapleton he gave the first account of the Howiesons Poort culture.

Awards
Honorary D.Sc. of the University of South Africa (1935)
South Africa Medal of the South African Association for the Advancement of Science (1936).
Fellow of the Royal Society of South Africa.

Eponym
Hewitt is honored in the specific name of a species of Bornean beetle, Cicindela hewittii and of South African lizard, Goggia hewitti.

Bibliography
Adler, Kraig (editor) (1989). Contributions to the History of Herpetology. St. Louis, Missouri: Society for the Study of Amphibians and Reptiles. p. 80.

References

External links
Albany Museum information
French Wikipedia entry on John Hewitt



20th-century South African zoologists
South African archaeologists
South African herpetologists
British curators
Alumni of Jesus College, Cambridge
South African science writers
Fellows of the Royal Society of South Africa
1880 births
1961 deaths
20th-century archaeologists
People from Dronfield
British emigrants to Transvaal Colony
Presidents of the South African Archaeological Society